Leo Graham Jr. (born 1941) is an American Chicago-based songwriter and producer who had a string of hits with Tyrone Davis. He was nominated for Grammy Award for Best R&B Song at 23rd Annual Grammy Awards for "Shining Star"

Songs

"Turning Point"

References

External links
Leo Graham biography at AllMusic
Leo Graham discography at Discogs
A feature on Leo Graham at Soul Express

1941 births
Living people
American male songwriters